The 2014 CONSUR Women's Sevens was the tenth edition of the tournament and was held in Santiago, Chile. The tournament was played as a round-robin with seven teams competing. Brazil were crowned champions after beating Argentina 40–0 in the final. They also qualified for the 2015 Pan American Games.

Results

Final

3rd Place Match

Final

References 

2014 in women's rugby union
2014 rugby sevens competitions
Rugby sevens competitions in South America
2014 in South American rugby union